The 2007 GP2 Series season was the forty-first season of the second-tier of Formula One feeder championship and also third season under the GP2 Series moniker. The series began on 14 April at Bahrain. Timo Glock was crowned series champion on 30 September after winning the final round at Valencia, with Brazilian Lucas di Grassi finishing second.

Season summary
The season started in Bahrain. Luca Filippi started the season with win from pole, while Nicolas Lapierre took his first GP2 win in his third season in the sprint race. One of pre-season favourites, Timo Glock finished 2nd in both races. Michael Ammermüller, who was driving for defending teams' champion ART Grand Prix was injured and missed next two races.

Next event started with big start crash involving several drivers, including series leader Filippi. Safety car was instantly deployed and majority of the field opted to make their mandatory pit stop. Glock wasn't one of those and he lost his chances to win the race as a result. Bruno Senna took his first GP2 victory in his third race. Glock finally got his first win of the season after three second places in the sprint.

At Monaco, only one race was held which was won by Pastor Maldonado who had celebrated a victory in World Series there in the previous year. Glock increased his podium streak to five races after finishing 3rd.

Two drivers made their comeback to GP2 in Magny-Cours. Adam Carroll replaced underperforming Antônio Pizzonia while Ernesto Viso replaced Sérgio Jimenez.

Glock took pole position in Magny-Cours but the race started difficult time for him. He crashed with his teammate Andreas Zuber who started second, just a few metres after the start. Later on the first lap, Viso had massive shunt in which his car turned over and flew over the concrete barrier. Viso was lucky not to suffer serious injuries. The race was eventually won by a veteran Giorgio Pantano, giving Campos Racing its first victory in GP2. Viso's teammate Javier Villa won the sprint race, becoming youngest ever winner in GP2 at that time (the record was broken a year later by Sébastien Buemi).

Glock failed to finish both Silverstone races as well. Zuber won the feature race while Carroll took the sprint, making it nine winners in nine races. More amazingly, they were divided to eight different teams: only iSport International had two drivers who had won a race at this point.

Glock rebounded to take feature race victory at his home soil in Nürburgring. Sprint race was won by Villa. Glock was also on pole in Hungaroring but failed to score after mistake during the race. Hungaroring race was won by Carroll who leap-frogged several positions with well-timed pit stop during the safety car, as those who had made their stops already had to use start/finish straight which had a lot of debris on it. Villa was again victorious in sprint race, with Carroll taking 2nd. Despite starting later in the season, he was en route to good position in the championship.

At Istanbul, Lucas di Grassi, who had finished in the points in every race except one at that point, took his first victory of the season. Glock won the sprint race, so he eventually got more points than di Grassi while these two were battling for the championship.

At Monza, Pantano won the feature race and Glock the sprint. di Grassi failed to get podium after car troubles at the end of the feature race. Pantano, meanwhile, was disqualified in the sprint race after driving several laps with broken front wing.

At Spa, Glock stalled at the start and finished the race in 17th position. Lapierre was the eventual winner. Glock then collided with Ricardo Risatti during reconnaissance lap of the sprint race and failed to start. di Grassi got good chance to close the gap on him but couldn't do better than third in a race which was won by the Indian Karun Chandhok.

The final race was held in Valencia and that was only race of the season which was not supporting F1. Glock started the weekend two points ahead of di Grassi. The feature race started on damp track. Tyre choice was crucial. The best drivers started on intermediates and then quite soon moved to slicks as the mandatory pit window had opened. The gaps in the race were exceptionally big, only five drivers finished in the same lap with the winner Vitaly Petrov. Glock was seventh while di Grassi spun off on damp track, just after switching to slicks. Glock got to start from the front row in the sprint race while di Grassi's place was near the back of the grid. Glock confirmed his championship with the victory in the final race, 11 points ahead of di Grassi. Pantano finished third in the series on countback ahead of Filippi.

Teams and drivers
All of the teams used the Dallara GP2/05 chassis with Renault-badged 4.0 litre (244 cu in) naturally-aspirated Mecachrome V8 engines order and with tyres supplied by Bridgestone.

Calendar

Results

Championship standings
Scoring system
Points are awarded to the top 8 classified finishers in the Feature race, and to the top 6 classified finishers in the Sprint race. The pole-sitter in the feature race will also receive two points, and one point is given to the driver who set the fastest lap in the feature and sprint races. The driver also had to start the race from his allocated grid position to be eligible to claim the fastest lap and has to drive 90% of race laps. No extra points are awarded to the pole-sitter in the sprint race.

Feature race points

Sprint race points
Points are awarded to the top 6 classified finishers.

Drivers' Championship

Notes:
 – Drivers did not finish the race, but were classified as they completed more than 90% of the race distance.

Teams' Championship

Notes:
 – Drivers did not finish the race, but were classified as they completed more than 90% of the race distance.

Notes

References

External links

 GP2 Series & GP2 Asia Series
 GP2 Series official Blog
 Results at autosport.com
 Results at sportresultaten.be

GP2 Series season 2007
GP2 Series seasons
GP2 Series